Georgios Evlampios (Akis) Petretzikis (born 4 March 1984) is a Greek celebrity chef. He is the CEO of Akis Petretzikis Ltd, which publishes cooking magazines and books, produces cooking shows, runs restaurants, and has an e-shop with various kitchen products designed by himself.

Born and raised in Thessaloniki, he started working in his family's business at the age of 16 and moved to Athens at 18 to study accounting and finance while also attending culinary school. He worked in the UK for five years before returning to Greece to compete in and win the first season of the Greek version of The Master Chef TV show. He has since hosted multiple cooking shows, including his own web series, Kitchen Lab and Akis’ Kitchen, and has collaborated with Fresh One Productions for Jamie Oliver's Food YouTube channel.

Early career 
Akis Petretzikis began his culinary studies in 2004 in the Le Monde school and then started working as a chef in various restaurants and hotels in Greece:
During the summer of 2004, he worked as a chef in Myconian Ambassador Relais & Chateaux in Mykonos and from September 2004 until February 2005, he worked as a Chef de Partie in 8 the Plate in Athens.
In February 2005, he worked as a Head Chef in Saint Nicolas Bay in Crete and in September 2005, he worked as a Head Chef in James Joyce in Athens.
In 2006, he moved to London, where he stayed for 5 years. He started working as a Chef de Partie in the Havana restaurant in Brighton. From 2008 to 2010, he worked as a Chef de Partie in The Goring hotel.
In 2010, he returned to Greece to take part in MEGA Channel's competitive cooking show, The Master Chef. He won becoming the first Greek Master Chef.
In 2011, he worked as a Head Chef in the Dali restaurant in the Marousi suburb of Athens and from 2012 until 2014 he worked as a Head Chef in Michel Roux’s restaurant – Avenue Bistro – in the Metropolitan Hotel.

Television 

After The Master Chef, Akis Petretzikis appeared in MEGA Channel's morning show To proino mou (My Μοrning) from 2010 to 2014. From 2014 to 2016, he hosted his own daily show Kan’ to opos o Akis (Do it like Akis). In the show's first season, Petretzikis made 2-3 recipes on each episode. He prepared cheap and easy recipes with simple ingredients giving practical advice to the viewers. In the show's second season, Petretzikis hosted a guest chef (professional or student) which made the second recipe of the show with his help.

In November 2014, he hosted a new show on MEGA channel, Istories apo tin lista (Stories from the list). Discovering an old notebook in which he recorded places, recipes and people he had met, Petretzikis set off to amazing journeys in Greece in order to rediscover all those he had recorded. The show's episodes were in a standalone format. Two years later, in 2017, he travelled to Cyprus for the show Mia valitsa gefsis (A suitcase of flavors), a show that aired on Sigma TV channel.

In 2017, Petretzikis hosted the original cooking reality show Ready, Steady, Cook which aired on Alpha TV channel. Two teams (the Tomato team and the Pepper team) battled each other in the kitchen. Each team had five ingredients and 20 minutes to make its recipe. Six famous chefs participated in the show in pairs: Andreas Kavazis, Kostis Kampas, Athinagoras Kostakos, Vagelis Leousis, Eva Monochari and Giorgos Papakostas. The winning team was selected after a public vote.

In 2017, he hosted the cooking show Kitchen Lab which aired on the TV channel Skai tv. Each Saturday and Sunday, Petretzikis cooked in his own cooking lab (Kitchen Lab) making his own recipes. At the end of each episode, he responded to viewer questions through the show's social wall.

In 2020, on the same TV channel, Akis Petretzikis presented another show, called Akis' Food Tour. It is a food and travel show in which Akis visits some of the most unique areas of Greece and discovers the beauty and the gastronomy of each place, always preparing his own recipes with traditional, local products.

In 2020 and 2021, Akis participated in the Ready Steady Cook show on the British television channel BBC One, where talented chefs create delicious dishes in just 20 minutes.

Social media
Akis Petretzikis is active in various social media, including Facebook, Instagram, Twitter, Viber and Pinterest.

His followers can see his recipes on his YouTube channel through his weekly web show Kitchen Lab. For non-Greek speakers, Petretzikis also has an English YouTube channel (Akis Kitchen), where he uploads videos in English.
In 2015, he started collaborating with Fresh One Productions uploading videos with Greek recipes in Jamie Oliver's Food Tube channel. Since then, Petretzikis is one of the 15 official affiliates of the network.

Books
In 2014, Akis Petretzikis published his first cooking magazine, Menu by Akis Petretzikis. In the same year, he also published his first book Αυτό πρέπει να το δοκιμάσεις ("You've got to try this"), which won the public's award in the Ευ Ζην category in 2015. In 2016, in collaboration with Nestlé Dessert couverture, he published his second book, Μόνο Σοκολάτα ("Only Chocolate").

In 2017, he published his third book, Piece of Cake. During the same year, he published his new self-titled magazine, a cooking magazine published by Attikes Publishing House. Published every 3-months, its target audience includes both beginners as well as experienced cooks.

In 2018, he published another book, My Greek Cuisine, which includes traditional and other recipes borrowed by Greek customs, holidays, traditions, and family moments. A year later, the same book was published in English, titled "Greek Comfort Food". In the same year (2019), another book by Akis Petretzikis, Street Food, was released. In its pages, one can find 120 recipes divided into 12 categories, according to their main characteristic, the recipes cover a wide range of choices like meat, fish, pasta, breads, desserts, etc. These recipes come from several parts of the world and they manage to bring street food to the reader's kitchen.

Awards

References

Living people
1984 births
Greek television chefs
Greek food writers
Cookbook writers